Leyna is a feminine given name. Notable people with the name include:

 Leyna Bloom (born 1990), American transgender model, dancer, actress, and activist
 Leyna Nguyen (born 1970), Vietnamese-American television anchor and reporter
 Leyna Weber (born April 18,1968), American actress

See also
 "All for Leyna", 1980 song by Billy Joel

Feminine given names